The Siege of Groningen was a battle that took place in 1672 during the Franco-Dutch war. It was a Dutch victory that ended all hope of the Bishop of Münster to push deeper into the Netherlands. The Münster army was so weakened by the defeat that the Dutch army successfully reconquered much of the land that Münster had conquered just weeks earlier. Every year, the city of Groningen celebrates its victory as a local holiday on 28 August.

Further reading

External links 
 

Groningen
1672 in the Dutch Republic
Groningen (1672)
Groningen (1672)
Groningen
History of Groningen (city)
Events in Groningen (city)
Franco-Dutch War